IASD may refer to:
 Inter-Allied Services Department of the Services Reconnaissance Department
 Iditarod Area School District